Glen Haven District No. 4 School and Public Library is a historic school and library building located at Fair Haven in Cortland County, New York.  It is a one-story irregularly shaped structure constructed in 1901 in the Shingle Style.  It contains the classroom on the south end and the library on the north end.  It features a hipped roof with boxed eave overhangs.

It was listed on the National Register of Historic Places in 1997.

It was designed by Rossiter & Wright and built by Andrew Lieber.

References

External links

Libraries on the National Register of Historic Places in New York (state)
School buildings on the National Register of Historic Places in New York (state)
Shingle Style architecture in New York (state)
Library buildings completed in 1901
School buildings completed in 1901
Buildings and structures in Cortland County, New York
National Register of Historic Places in Cortland County, New York
1901 establishments in New York (state)